Marcus Valerius Messalla Corvinus was a Roman Senator who lived in the Roman Empire in the 1st century.

Biography

Early life
Corvinus was a member of the Republican gens Valeria. Corvinus was the namesake of the Senator and Augustan literary patron Marcus Valerius Messalla Corvinus. He may have been a son of the Senator and consul Marcus Aurelius Cotta Maximus Messalinus, who was a son of Marcus Valerius Messalla Corvinus, or possibly the son of the consul Marcus Valerius Messalla Barbatus and Domitia Lepida the Younger, thus making him the brother of Valeria Messalina, the third wife of the emperor Claudius.

Political career
In 46/47AD, Corvinus was a member of the Arval Brethren. From January to April in 58AD, he served as an ordinary consul with the emperor Nero and then from May to June in 58AD, as a suffect consul with Gaius Fonteius Agrippa. Starting with his consulship, he was granted an annual half a million sesterces to maintain his senatorial qualifications.

References

Sources
 Tacitus, Annals of Imperial Rome 
 D. Shotter, Nero (Google eBook) Routledge, 2012 
 Lucan, Civil War (Google eBook), Penguin, 2012
 Velleius Paterculus – Translated with Introduction and Notes by J.C. Yardley & A.A. Barrett, The Roman History, Hackett Publishing, 2011
 Biographischer Index der Antike (Google eBook), Walter de Gruyter, 2001

Corvinus, Marcus
Roman patricians
Imperial Roman consuls
1st-century Romans
1st-century clergy